Undercover Man is a 1936 American Western film directed by Albert Ray, written by Andrew Bennison, and starring Johnny Mack Brown, Suzanne Kaaren, Ted Adams, Frank Darien, Horace Murphy and Lloyd Ingraham. It was released on September 24, 1936, by Republic Pictures.

Plot

Cast
 Johnny Mack Brown as Steve McLain
 Suzanne Kaaren as Linda Forbes
 Ted Adams as Ace Pringle
 Frank Darien as Dizzy Slocum
 Horace Murphy as Sheriff
 Lloyd Ingraham as Judge Forbes
 Dick Morehead as Deputy Rusty
 Ed Cassidy as Henchman Slim

References

External links
 
 
 
 

1936 films
American Western (genre) films
1936 Western (genre) films
Republic Pictures films
Films directed by Albert Ray
American black-and-white films
1930s English-language films
1930s American films